The slender pipefish (Microphis caudocarinatus) is a species of fish in the family Syngnathidae. It is endemic to West Papua in Indonesia.

References

Microphis
Freshwater fish of Western New Guinea
Fish described in 1907
Taxonomy articles created by Polbot